The TMD-40 was a wooden-cased Soviet anti-tank blast mine used during the Second World War. The mine consisted of a rectangular wooden box which contained a detonator assembly at each end and seven 400 gram and four 200 gram blocks of explosive. The fuse assemblies consisted of a lever device, which when pressed downward by pressure pieces attached to the lid of the mine, see-sawed upward, pulling the striker retaining pin from a pull detonator. The main charge was then triggered.

Specifications
 Weight: 5 kg or 6.9 kg depending on source
 Explosive content: 3.6 kg
 Height: 10 cm approx
 Length: 60 cm approx
 Operating pressure: 80 to 250 kg depending on source

See also
 TMD-44 and TMD-B mines

References
 http://tewton.narod.ru/mines-2/tmd-40.html
 

Anti-tank mines
Land mines of the Soviet Union
World War II weapons of the Soviet Union